Erythrina eggersii is a vine or tree in the family Fabaceae which is commonly known as cock's-spur, espuelo de gallo, or pinon espinoso. It is native to Puerto Rico, the British Virgin Islands (Jost Van Dyke) and the U.S. Virgin Islands, where it is threatened by the act of  habitat loss.

References

Sources

eggersii
Flora of Puerto Rico
Endangered plants
Taxonomy articles created by Polbot